Bremnestuva or Bremnestua is a small mountain in the municipality of Frøya in Trøndelag county, Norway. There is a road to the top of the mountain where there is a water tank, a mobile telephone tower, and a great view.

References

Mountains of Trøndelag
Frøya, Trøndelag